Songcatcher is a 2000 drama film directed by Maggie Greenwald. It is about a musicologist researching and collecting Appalachian folk music in the mountains of western North Carolina. Although Songcatcher is a fictional film, it is loosely based on the work of Olive Dame Campbell, founder of the John C. Campbell Folk School in Brasstown, North Carolina, and that of the English folk song collector Cecil Sharp, portrayed at the end of the film as professor Cyrus Whittle. The film grossed $3 million in limited theatrical release in the United States, which was generally considered as a respectable result for an arthouse film release in  2001.

Plot 
In 1907, Dr. Lily Penleric (Janet McTeer), a professor of musicology, is denied a promotion at the university where she teaches. She impulsively visits her sister Eleanor (Jane Adams), who runs a struggling rural school in Appalachia. There, she discovers a treasure trove of traditional English and Scotch-Irish ballads, which have been preserved by the secluded mountain people since the colonial period of the 1600s and 1700s. Lily decides to record and transcribe the songs and share them with the outside world.

With the help of a musically talented orphan named Deladis Slocumb (Emmy Rossum), Lily ventures into isolated areas of the mountains to collect the songs. She finds herself increasingly enchanted, not only by the rugged purity of the music, but also by the courage and endurance of the local people as they carve out meaningful lives against the harsh conditions. She becomes privy to their struggles to save their land from Earl Giddens (David Patrick Kelly), representative of a coal mining company. At the same time, Lily is troubled when she finds that Eleanor is engaged in a lesbian love affair with her co-teacher at the school.

Lily meets Tom Bledsoe (Aidan Quinn), a handsome, hardened war veteran and talented musician. Despite some initial suspicion from Tom that Lily is exploiting his community's traditions, they grow attracted to one another and soon begin a love affair. She experiences a slow change in both her perception of the mountain people as savage and uncouth, and of her sister's sexuality as immoral.

Events come to a crisis when a young man discovers Eleanor and her lover, Harriet, kissing in the woods. That night, two men set fire to the school building, burning Eleanor, Harriet, and Deladis out of their home and destroying Lily's transcriptions of the ballads and her phonograph recordings. Rather than starting over again, Lily decides to leave, but she convinces Tom and Deladis to "go down the mountain" with her to make and sell phonograph recordings of mountain music. As they depart, Cyrus Whittle, a renowned professor from England, arrives on a collection foray of his own, ensuring that the ballads will be preserved in the manner that Lily had originally intended.

Cast 

The character of Viney Butler was based on Mary Jane Queen, whom Greenwald consulted when researching the film.

Production
Producer Ellen Rigas invested $3 million in Songcatcher which her family borrowed as part of the Adelphia Communications fraud.

Soundtrack 

The film's score was written by David Mansfield, who also assembled a roster of female country music artists to perform mostly traditional mountain ballads. Some of the songs are contemporary arrangements, and some are played in the traditional Appalachian music style. The artists include Rosanne Cash, Emmylou Harris, Maria McKee, Dolly Parton, Gillian Welch and Patty Loveless. Singers Emmy Rossum, Iris DeMent, and Hazel Dickens, who appeared in the film, are also featured on the soundtrack.

The soundtrack album inspired the 2002 follow-up album by Vanguard Records, Songcatcher II: The Tradition That Inspired the Movie, that compiled recordings of some of the songs selected for the film as performed by authentic Appalachian artists. The recordings are mostly from the 1960s, out of the Vanguard vaults.

Track listing 
 "Fair and Tender Ladies" (Traditional, performed by Rosanne Cash) – 2:56
 "Pretty Saro" (Traditional, performed by Iris DeMent) – 2:54
 "When Love Is New" (Composed and performed by Dolly Parton) – 5:16
 "Barbara Allen" (Traditional, performed by Emmy Rossum) – 0:43
 "Barbara Allen" (Traditional, performed by Emmylou Harris) – 4:35
 "Moonshiner" (Traditional, performed by Allison Moorer) – 3:34
 "Sounds of Loneliness" (Composed by Patty Ramey, performed by Patty Loveless) – 3:44
 "All My Tears" (Composed and performed by Julie Miller) – 3:11
 "Mary of the Wild Moor" (Traditional, performed by Sara Evans) – 3:51
 "Wayfaring Stranger (Traditional, Maria McKee) – 3:24
 "Wind and Rain" (Traditional, performed by Gillian Welch and David Rawlings) – 3:25
 "The Cuckoo Bird" (Traditional, performed by Deana Carter) – 3:33
 "Score Suite # 1" (Composed by David Mansfield) – 5:01
 "Conversation With Death" (Traditional, performed by Hazel Dickens) – 3:01
 "Score Suite # 2" (Composed by David Mansfield) – 4:58
 "Single Girl" (Traditional, performed by Pat Carroll) – 1:04

Chart performance

Reception
The review aggregation website Rotten Tomatoes reported a 74% approval rating with an average rating of 6.34/10 based on 88 reviews. The website's consensus reads, "The story may be a bit too melodramatic, but great performances abound in Songcatcher. The real reason to see the movie, however, is the hypnotic music." Metacritic assigned a score of 63 out of 100, based on 27 critics, indicating "generally favorable reviews".

Accolades
It was nominated for two Independent Spirit Awards.

See also
Folk music
Alan Lomax
Loraine Wyman – a popular songcatcher of the same historical period
Anthology of American Folk Music
Folk music revival

References

Further reading 
 Dorothy Scarborough, A Song Catcher in Southern Mountains:  American Folk Songs of British Ancestry.  New York: Columbia University Press, 1937.

External links 
 
 
 

Sundance Film Festival award winners
2000 independent films
2000 films
2000 drama films
American LGBT-related films
Lesbian-related films
Country music films
Films shot in North Carolina
Lionsgate films
Films scored by David Mansfield
Films set in 1907
Films set in Appalachia
Films set in the 1900s
2000s English-language films
2000s American films
Films directed by Maggie Greenwald
English-language drama films
LGBT-related drama films